South Kerry was a UK Parliament constituency in Ireland, returning one Member of Parliament between 1885 and 1922.

Prior to the 1885 general election, the area was part of the Kerry constituency. Representation at Westminster in this constituency ceased at the 1922 United Kingdom general election, which took place on 15 November, shortly before the establishment of the Irish Free State on 6 December 1922. The successor constituency in the new Dáil Éireann was Kerry–Limerick West, first established under the Government of Ireland Act 1920 to elect members to the House of Commons of Southern Ireland in 1921.

Boundaries
This constituency comprised the southern part of County Kerry.

1885–1922: The baronies of Dunkerron North, Dunkerron South, Glanarought and Iveragh.

Members of Parliament

Elections

Elections in the 1880s

Elections in the 1890s

Kilbride is also elected MP for Galway North and elects to sit there, prompting a by-election.

Elections in the 1900s

Elections in the 1910s

References

Westminster constituencies in County Kerry (historic)
Dáil constituencies in the Republic of Ireland (historic)
Constituencies of the Parliament of the United Kingdom established in 1885
Constituencies of the Parliament of the United Kingdom disestablished in 1922
1885 establishments in Ireland
1922 disestablishments in Ireland